Popsie was a Swedish pop girl group consisting of Cecilia Lind, Zandra Pettersson, Angelica Sanchez and Katarina Sundqvist. Between 1997 and 1998 they had several charting songs on the Sverigetopplistan like "Single", "Joyful Life", "Latin Lover", "Rough Enough" and "24Seven".

Discography

Singles

References

Swedish pop music groups